Dufresne or du Fresne is a surname. Notable people with the surname include:

Armand A. Dufresne Jr. (1909–1994), Justice of the Maine Supreme Judicial Court
Begoña Vía-Dufresne (born 1971), Spanish sailor and Olympic champion
Charles Dufresne (1876-1938), French painter
Chris Dufresne, (1958–2020) American sports journalist
Diane Dufresne (born 1944), Canadian singer and painter
Donald Dufresne (born 1967), retired Canadian ice hockey defenceman
Gaston Dufresne (1898–1998), contrabassist in the Boston Symphony Orchestra
Gérard Dufresne (1918–2013), politician and military officer in Quebec
Guillaume Dufresne d'Arsel, who established French rule of Mauritius
Jean Dufresne (1829–1893), German chess player
John Dufresne (born 1948), American author of French-Canadian descent
Joseph Dufresne (1805–1873), Quebec notary and political figure

Laurent Dufresne (born 1972), former French football team captain
Louis Dufresne (1752–1832)  French explorer, ornithologist and taxidermist
Marc-Joseph Marion du Fresne (1724–1772), French explorer
Nicole duFresne (born 1973), Spanish sportive sailor
Wylie Dufresne (born 1970), chef and restaurant owner in Manhattan
Fictional people
Andy Dufresne, the protagonist of the film The Shawshank Redemption and the novella the film is based on
Frank 'Doc' DuFresne, a character in the web television series Red vs. Blue

French-language surnames